Riva presso Chieri is a comune (municipality) in the Metropolitan City of Turin in the Italian region Piedmont, located about  southeast of Turin.

People
Domenico Savio, canonized by Pope Pius XII in 1954.

References

Sources
 

Cities and towns in Piedmont